Dylan Holmes is an Australian female soccer player.

Dylan Holmes may also refer to:

Dylan Holmes (actor) in Nothing Trivial
Dylan Holmes, one of the Modern Family characters